The eremitic Rule of Saint Albert is the shortest of the rules of consecrated life in existence of the Catholic spiritual tradition, and is composed almost exclusively of scriptural precepts. To this day it is a rich source of inspiration for the lives of many Catholics throughout the world.

Writing
Saint Albert Avogadro (1149–1214), a priest of the Canons Regular and a canon lawyer, wrote the Rule between 1206 and 1214 as the Catholic Latin Patriarch of Jerusalem. The Rule is directed to "Brother B.", held by tradition to be either Saint Bertold or Saint Brocard (but historical evidence of his identity is lacking), and the hermits living in the spirit of Elijah near the prophet's spring on Mount Carmel in present-day Israel. On 30 January 1226 Pope Honorius III approved it as their rule of life in the bull Ut vivendi normam.

Innocentian Rule
About 20 years later on 1 October 1247, in consultation with Dominican theologians Cardinal Hugh of Saint Cher and Bishop William of Tortosa, Pope Innocent IV revised the Rule slightly in the decree Quae Honorem to reflect the realities of the mendicant and monastic life to which the original hermits had been forced to adapt due to the threat of Muslim attacks in Palestine. Through events surrounding the Crusades the hermits, or Brothers of Our Lady of Mount Carmel as they came to be known, were forced to flee Mount Carmel to Europe. In Europe the Carmelites were recognised as a mendicant order and monasteries, or "Carmels" as they are called, were founded.

Official text
The Rule of life given to the Carmelites by Saint Albert Avogadro between the years 1206 – 1214 was finally approved as the true and proper Rule of Carmel by Pope Innocent IV in 1247.  All Carmelites must follow this official version today.

Aspects
The Rule states that it is fundamental for a Carmelite to "live a life in allegiance to Jesus Christ – how, pure in heart and stout in conscience, must be unswerving in the service of the Master" (no. 2). To live a life of allegiance to Jesus Christ, the Carmelites bind themselves especially to:
    
 develop the contemplative dimension of their life, in an open dialogue with God 
 live full of charity
 meditate day and night on the Word of the Lord 
 pray together or alone several times a day 
 celebrate the Eucharist every day 
 do manual work, as Paul the Apostle did 
 purify themselves of every trace of evil 
 live in poverty, placing in common what little they may have 
 love the Church and all people 
 conform their will to that of God, seeking the will of God in faith, in dialogue and through discernment.

See also
Book of the First Monks
Constitutions of the Carmelite Order
Carmelite Rite
Hermit

References

External links
 The Rule of St Albert: Latin Text edited with an introduction and English translation, ed and trans Bede Edwards, (Aylesford and London, 1973)
 "Land of Carmel" by Elizabeth Ruth Obbard
 Rule of St. Albert
 'Chronological History of the Carmelite Order' – Irish Carmelite Province

Carmelite spirituality
Monastic rules